In optics, an image is defined as the collection of focus points of light rays coming from an object. A real image is the collection of focus points actually made by converging/diverging rays, while a virtual image is the collection of focus points made by extensions of diverging or converging rays. In other words, it is an image which is located in the plane of convergence for the light rays that originate from a given object. Examples of real images include the image produced on a detector in the rear of a camera, and the image produced on an eyeball retina (the camera and eye focus light through an internal convex lens). 

In ray diagrams (such as the images on the right), real rays of light are always represented by full, solid lines; perceived or extrapolated rays of light are represented by dashed lines. A real image occurs where rays converge, whereas a virtual image occurs where rays only appear to diverge.

Real images can be produced by concave mirrors and converging lenses, only if the object is placed further away from the mirror/lens than the focal point, and this real image is inverted. As the object approaches the focal point the image approaches infinity, and when the object passes the focal point the image becomes virtual and is not inverted (upright image). The distance is not the same as from the object to the lenses.

Real images may also be inspected by a second lens or lens system. This is the mechanism used by telescopes, binoculars and light microscopes. The objective lens gathers the light from the object and projects a real image within the structure of the optical instrument. A second lens or system of lenses, the eyepiece, then projects a second real image onto the retina of the eye.

See also
Focal plane
Image plane
Lens
Virtual image

Geometrical optics